The northern frog (Ingerana borealis), or the Rotung oriental frog is a species of frog in the family Dicroglossidae. It is found in Bangladesh, Bhutan, northeastern India, Tibet, Nepal, and western Myanmar.

Its natural habitats are small, still waters and slow-moving waters in tropical moist forests. It is threatened by pollution due to agrochemicals but also by habitat loss and degradation.

References

borealis
Amphibians of Bangladesh
Amphibians of Bhutan
Amphibians of Myanmar
Amphibians of China
Frogs of India
Amphibians of Nepal
Fauna of Tibet
Taxa named by Nelson Annandale
Amphibians described in 1912
Taxonomy articles created by Polbot